Henry Graham may refer to:

 Henry Graham (cricketer) (1914–1982), English cricketer
 Henry Graham (of Levens), English gentleman, heir to a Westmorland estate, and member of parliament
 Henry Graham (parliamentary clerk) (1842–1930), Scottish public servant
 Henry Graham (poet) (1930–2019), British poet
 Henry V. Graham (1916–1999), American Army general

See also
 
 Harry Graham (disambiguation)